Inkinga carnosa is a species of small sea snail, a marine gastropod mollusk in the family Horaiclavidae.

Description

Distribution
This marine species occurs off South Africa.

References

External links
  Kilburn R.N. 2005. New species of Drilliidae and Turridae from southern Africa (Mollusca: Gastropoda: Conoidea). African Invertebrates, 46: 85–92

Endemic fauna of South Africa
carnosa
Gastropods described in 2005